The 1994–95 season of the División de Honor de Futsal is the 6th season of top-tier futsal in Spain. It was divided in two rounds. First round divided in two groups of 10 teams every one, and second round in which advanced the best 6 team of every group. The 4 last teams of every group played the Permanence round.

Regular season

1st round

Group Par

Group Impar

2nd round

Group Title

Group Title

Permanence group

Egasa Coruña, 6 points deducted

Playoffs

See also
División de Honor de Futsal
Futsal in Spain

External links
1994–95 season at lnfs.es

1994 95
Spain
futsal